Duchess Elisabeth Alexandrine Constance of Württemberg (27 February 1802 in Würzau, Courland Governorate – 5 December 1864, in Karlsruhe) was a daughter of Duke Louis of Württemberg and Princess Henriette of Nassau-Weilburg.

Family

Elisabeth was one of five children born to Duke Louis of Württemberg and his second wife Princess Henriette of Nassau-Weilburg. Her siblings included Queen Pauline of Württemberg and Duke Alexander of Württemberg, the founder of the Teck branch of the family.

She was tutored by her governess, the known memoirist Alexandrine des Écherolles, who described her pupils in her memoirs.

Marriage and children
Elisabeth married Prince William of Baden on 16 October 1830. Ten years older than she was, he was the second son of Charles Frederick, Grand Duke of Baden and his second wife Luise Karoline Geyer von Geyersberg. Due to the low birth rank of his mother, William had no succession rights for a time to the Grand Duchy of Baden (until his brother succeeded as Leopold I, Grand Duke of Baden earlier that year).

Elisabeth and William had issue:

 Princess Wilhelmine Pauline Henriette Amalie Louise (May 7, 1833 – August 7, 1834).
 Princess Sophie Pauline Henriette Amalie Louise (August 7, 1834 – April 6, 1904), married Woldemar, Prince of Lippe on November 9, 1858.
 Princess Pauline Sophie Elisabeth Marie (December 18, 1835 – May 15, 1891).
 Princess Leopoldine Wilhelmine Pauline Amalie Maximiliane (February 22, 1837 – December 23, 1903), married Hermann VI, Prince of Hohenlohe-Langenburg on September 24, 1862.

Death
William died on 11 October 1859. Elisabeth would die five years later, on 5 December 1864.

Ancestry

References

1802 births
1864 deaths
People from Jelgava Municipality
House of Württemberg
Duchesses of Württemberg
House of Zähringen
Royal reburials